Fuscopannaria granulifera is a species of squamulose (scaley), corticolous (bark-dwelling) lichen in the family Pannariaceae. Found in India, it was formally described as a new species in 2004 by Norwegian lichenologist Per Magnus Jørgensen. It is only known to occur in the upper forests of western Himalayas. F. granulifera is the only corticolous member of its genus that has a green algal photobiont; all others have a cyanobacterial photobiont.

References

granulifera
Lichen species
Lichens described in 2004
Lichens of the Indian subcontinent
Taxa named by Per Magnus Jørgensen